Estanislau Basora Brunet (also Estanislao; 18 November 1926 – 16 March 2012) was a Spanish footballer who played as a winger or striker.

Most of his 15-year career was spent at FC Barcelona for which he appeared in more than 300 official games, surpassing the 100-goal mark and winning 14 major titles.

A Spanish international in the late 1940s/early 1950s, Basora represented the nation at the 1950 World Cup.

Club career
Born in Colonia Valls, Barcelona, Catalonia, Basora joined local and La Liga giants FC Barcelona in 1946, from neighbouring CE Manresa. He made his league debut on 22 September in a 1–1 home draw against Celta de Vigo, but finished his first season with only three appearances for the club.

In the following years, however, Basora was an undisputed starter, winning four titles from 1947 to 1949, including two national championships to which he contributed with 20 goals in 51 games combined under coach Enrique Fernández. He was part of a legendary offensive line which also included César, László Kubala, Eduardo Manchón, Mariano Martín and Moreno, and scored the opening goal in the 1949 Latin Cup, a 2–1 defeat of Sporting Clube de Portugal.

In the 1951–52 season, Basora was an essential offensive unit as Barça won five titles. He scored eight in 27 matches in the league, and also found the net in the campaign's Copa del Generalísimo final, a 4–2 win against Valencia CF. He also spent one of his twelve years with the team on loan to another outfit in the region, UE Lleida, retiring in 1959 at nearly 33 years of age with official totals for his main club of 301 games and 113 goals; in 1974, during Barcelona's 75th anniversary celebrations, he was included in their all-time best XI.

International career
During eight years, Basora played 22 games and scored 13 goals for Spain. On 12 June 1949 he netted on his debut, a 4–1 win against the Republic of Ireland. A week later, in another friendly, he scored a hat-trick within fifteen minutes against France at the Stade de Colombes, being subsequently dubbed by the French press "The Monster of Colombes".

Basora represented the nation at the 1950 FIFA World Cup in France, forming a formidable offensive partnership with Telmo Zarra. In the opening game against the United States, Spain were 0–1 down with ten minutes to go before Basora scored twice inside a minute – Zarra then added a third for the final 3–1.

In the second group game Spain beat Chile 2–0, with both players again on target. The side then confirmed its place in the next stage with a 1–0 win against England, with Zarra heading in a Basora cross; the second group stage started against Uruguay, and he found the net twice to help the team come from behind 0–1, but the South Americans eventually tied it 2–2 and the national team lost the following two games.

Between 1948 and 1958 Basora also played five games for the Catalan XI, scoring twice. On 26 January 1955, he appeared alongside Kubala and guest player Alfredo Di Stéfano in a game against Bologna F.C. 1909 at the Camp de Les Corts.

International goals

Personal life / Death
Basora's younger brother, Joaquín, was also a footballer. Often referred to as Basora II, the forward represented, in the top division, CD Condal and Sporting de Gijón.

On 16 March 2012, days after having suffered a heart attack, Basora I died at the University Hospital of Las Palmas. He was 85 years old.

Honours
Barcelona
Inter-Cities Fairs Cup: 1955–58
La Liga: 1947–48, 1948–49, 1951–52, 1952–53
Copa del Generalísimo: 1951, 1952, 1952–53, 1957
Latin Cup: 1949, 1952
Copa Eva Duarte: 1948, 1952, 1953
Small Club World Cup: 1957

References

External links
 
 FC Barcelona profile
 
 

1926 births
2012 deaths
People from Bages
Sportspeople from the Province of Barcelona
Spanish footballers
Footballers from Catalonia
Association football wingers
Association football forwards
La Liga players
Segunda División players
CE Manresa players
FC Barcelona players
UE Lleida players
Spain B international footballers
Spain international footballers
1950 FIFA World Cup players
Catalonia international footballers